Bathycrinus mendeleevi is a species of sea lily, a crinoid in the family Bathycrinidae. It is native to the Pacific Ocean west of South America. It was described  by A. N. Mironov.

Distribution

References 

Bourgueticrinida
Animals described in 2008
Echinoderms of New Zealand